Legislative elections were held in Russia on 18 September 2016. Of the 450 seats in the State Duma, half were elected in single-member constituencies. The results are detailed in the table below.

Summary
Out of 206 constituencies in which United Russia ran a candidate, they won 203, losing 3 contests to the Communist Party of the Russian Federation.

Out of 19 constituencies which did not have a United Russia candidate, 7 were won by A Just Russia, 5 by Liberal Democratic Party of Russia, 4 by Communist Party, and 1 each by an independent candidate, Civic Platform and Rodina.

Out of the other parties that ran candidates, the best result for Communists of Russia was the second spot in Karachay-Cherkessia, Greens came in third in Sterlitamak, People's Freedom Party came in third in Centre Moscow, Party of Growth came in second in Sevastopol, South-East, East and Center St. Petersburg, Buryatia, Kanash/Chuvashia and Udmurtia, Yabloko was second in Tushino, Leningradsky, Babushkinsky and Nagatinsky constituencies of Moscow, North-East St. Petersburg and Bryansk, Patriots of Russia was second in Seimsky constituency of Kursk and Krasnoarmeysky constituency of Volgograd. Civilian Power did not reach the top three in any constituencies.

Results by constituency

Notes

References

Results
Election results in Russia